MCPB, 2,4-MCPB, 4-(4-chloro-o-tolyloxy)butyric acid (IUPAC), or 4-(4-chloro-2-methylphenoxy)butanoic acid (CAS) is a phenoxybutyric herbicide.  In the United States it is registered for use on pea crops before flowering, for post-emergence control of broadleaf annual and perennial weeds including Canadian thistle, buttercup, mustard, purslane, ragweed, common lambsquarters, pigweed, smartweed, sowthistle, and morning glory.  It has low to moderate acute toxicity, with kidney and liver effects as the main hazard concerns.  It is not volatile, persistent, or likely to bioconcentrate.

A variety of methods have been developed for its analysis.  In the U.S., the maximum residue permitted on peas is 0.1 parts per million.

References

External links 
 

Carboxylic acids
Auxinic herbicides
Chlorobenzenes
Phenol ethers